Derek McDowell (born 11 September 1958) is a former Irish Labour Party politician. He was a Teachta Dála (TD) from 1992 to 2002, and member of the 22nd Seanad Éireann from 2002 to 2007.

McDowell was an unsuccessful candidate at the 1989 general election in the Dublin North-Central constituency, but at the 1992 general election he was returned to the 27th Dáil, topping the poll with 23% of the first-preference votes. He was re-elected at the 1997 general election with a much reduced share of the vote, but lost his seat at the 2002 general election to the independent candidate Finian McGrath.

After the loss of his seat in Dáil Éireann, McDowell was elected to the 22nd Seanad by the Industrial and Commercial Panel, where he was Labour's Seanad spokesperson on Finance, Transport, Enterprise, Trade and Employment. At the 2007 general election, he stood again in the Dublin North–Central constituency, but did not regain his seat. He did not contest the subsequent elections to the 23rd Seanad.

Derek McDowell worked as Head of International Advocacy at Concern Worldwide, a development NGO Headquartered in Dublin, Ireland. During the 2011–2016 Fine Gael–Labour Party coalition he served as Deputy Government Press Secretary and advisor to Tánaiste Eamon Gilmore and Tánaiste Joan Burton.

References

1958 births
Living people
Local councillors in Dublin (city)
Labour Party (Ireland) TDs
Members of the 27th Dáil
Members of the 28th Dáil
Members of the 22nd Seanad
Labour Party (Ireland) senators